Forces of the Rashidun Caliphate seized the major Mediterranean port of Alexandria away from the Eastern Roman Empire in the middle of the 7th century AD. Alexandria had been the capital of the Byzantine province of Egypt. This ended Eastern Roman maritime control and economic dominance of the Eastern Mediterranean and thus continued to shift geopolitical power further in favor of the Rashidun Caliphate.

Historical overview
With the death of Muhammad in 632 AD, the Muslim world began a period of rapid expansion. Under the rule of the first caliphs, the Rashidun, Muslim armies began assaulting the borders of both Sassanid Persia and the Byzantine Empire. Neither of the two former powers was prepared for the aggressive expansion of the Arabs, as both largely underestimated Islam and its growing support; this is best depicted by the ambivalent views held by the Byzantines and the painstakingly slow reaction of the Sassanids. After smashing both the Byzantines at Yarmuk (636) and the Persians at Qadisiyah (637), Muslim expansion set its sights south towards the rich provinces of Byzantine Africa.

Following Muslim conquest, the local populace and political infrastructure was left largely intact, albeit under Muslim control. Some groups were persecuted, namely anyone deemed to be "pagan" or an "idolater". The Muslim conquerors were generally tolerant of the Jews and Christians of captured regions. Many rose to positions of relative power and affluence in the new cities like Baghdad. This led to a stable and smooth running empire. The only major difference in treatment between Muslims and non-Muslims was the taxation system. Non believers were obligated to pay to the local government, called the jizya, while Muslims had to pay a Zakāt. Due to paying jizya by the non-believers, it becomes the mandatory responsibility to the Muslim ruler to protect their (non-believers) life and wealth. This jizya also as for the non-believers, who do not participate the war conducted by the Muslim government. jizya is not applicable for old persons, women and children only for the capable persons who are able to participate in war willingly not want to do so.

Byzantine Alexandria
The rulers of Alexandria before the arrival of Islam were the Romans. A heavily trafficked port city, Alexandria was crucial to maintaining imperial control over the region, based on its large Greco-Egyptian population and economic importance. The population of Alexandria was heavily influenced by both the cultural and religious views of their Roman rulers; nevertheless, the rural population spoke Coptic, rather than Greek, which was more common in the coastal cities.

Egypt at the time had just recently been conquered by the Sasanian Empire and retaken by treaty. The Chalcedonian Schism had torn the empire between Chalcedonians and non-Chalcedonians, with most of Egypt’s population being non-Chalcedonian. The emperor, Heraclius was a Chalcedonian, and had appointed Cyrus as both the Chalcedonian Patriarch of Alexandria (who was unrecognised by the Egyptians) and the praefectus Aegypti. Cyrus enstated a ten-year-long reign of terror in an attempt to bring the Egyptians to Chalcedonianism, forcing them to pray in secret and torturing many to death. The Coptic Pope, Pope Benjamin I, was in hiding throughout this, and ruthlessly but unsuccessfully pursued by Cyrus.

The Byzantines relied on Egypt as the main center of food production for wheat and other foodstuffs. Alexandria also functioned as one of Byzantium’s primary army and naval bases, as there was normally a significant imperial garrison stationed in the city. Though with the loss of Jerusalem in 638, much of Roman attention was drawn towards strengthening their hold on the frontier, chiefly in Anatolia and Egypt. Even though they would be able to successfully hold Asia Minor and retain it as an imperial base province, as time went on, Egypt became increasingly difficult to defend.

Rashidun conquest of Egypt 

In 634, the Muslim leader Umar ascended to the role of caliph and inherited a heterogeneous and rapidly expanding Islamic empire. Throughout the early 640s, he set his sights on the economically desirable province of Egypt and its capital city of Alexandria. The Muslim invasion of Egypt was led by the commander Amr ibn Al-Aas, who commanded a force larger than any army that the Byzantines could field at the time, as a result of their crushing defeat at Yarmuk four years earlier.

The original attempts by the Arab forces were not directed solely towards Alexandria, but rather at removing the Byzantine fortress of Babylon (Siege of Babylon Fortress) on the Nile Delta. The destruction of the Byzantine military power at the ensuing battle of Heliopolis, also known as Ain Shams, in the summer of 640 and the victory over the Byzantine defenders at Babylon effectively broke Byzantine power in Egypt.

Fall of Alexandria and aftermath

Following the destruction of the Byzantine forces at Heliopolis, the city of Alexandria was left virtually defenseless and it is likely that only a fraction of provincial forces remained garrisoned in the city itself. Though the Byzantines were unable to field an effective force, Alexandria's substantial fortifications, especially wall-mounted artillery, proved to be valuable assets and were adequate in keeping the Muslim attackers from mounting large attacks. However, in September 641, after a six-month siege, a day of ferocious attack commenced by 'Ubadah ibn as-Samit, reinforcement commander who just arrived from Medina crushed the Byzantine last defense.

When they entered Alexandria, the Coptic annals report that the Arabs “destroyed its walls and burnt many churches with fire,” including the ancient church founded by and containing the remains of Saint Mark.

'Ubadah strategy
Shortly after, 'Ubadah lead a detachment to launch attack to Alexandria on the same day. 'Ubadah employed extremely ingenious strategies. He first dug deep trenches and hid important portions of his troops inside. This was done without being acknowledged by Byzantine defenders in Alexandria, so it was likely accomplished before the battle happened. The trenches were described as being deep enough to entirely hide a horse. As soon he and his main force has arrived at the outskirts of Alexandria, 'Ubadah gave the signal to the entire army including those who hid in the trenches to launch a general assault. The powerful strike was said to successfully rout the Alexandrian garrison forces on the very first charge.

Capitulation of Alexandria
After the conquest completed, 'Ubadah stay in Egypt for while assisting 'Amr to built Fustat city and its landmark, Mosque Amr ibn al-Aas. A treaty to evacuate the Byzantine garrison from the city and Babylon fortress was signed on November 8, 641.

The "Treaty of Alexandria", recorded by John of Nikiu, included:
 Payment of a fixed tribute by all who came under the treaty.
 An armistice of about eleven months, to expire the first day of the Coptic month Paophi, i.e. September 28, 642.
 During the armistice the Arab forces to maintain their positions, but to keep apart and undertake no military operations against Alexandria; the Roman forces to cease all acts of hostility.
 The garrison of Alexandria and all troops there to embark and depart by sea, carrying all their possessions and treasure with them: but any Roman soldiers quitting Egypt by land to be subject to a monthly tribute on their journey.
 No Roman army to return or attempt the recovery of Egypt.
 The Muslims to desist from all seizure of churches, and not to interfere in any way with the Christians.
 The Jews to be suffered to remain at Alexandria.
 Hostages to be given by the Romans, viz. 150 military and 50 civilian, for the due execution of the treaty.

The impact of such a major event as the loss of Alexandria to Muslim forces was felt throughout the Mediterranean world. The decrease in the annual grain shipments from Egypt struck a decisive blow to the Byzantine economy; besides the simple fact of fewer available resources, the empire lost untold thousands in taxes from the grain merchants now traveling southward towards Damascus and Alexandria. In such a weakened condition, the empire was barely able to bail itself out financially and, in some instances, had to resort to piracy, attacking merchant ships and “requisitioning” their cargo before distributing it to Byzantine or allied ports.

Historically, Alexandria had provided Byzantium with a steady income of both money and luxury items, though some scholars speculate that the imposition of especially high taxes in the final decades of Byzantine rule may have been a considerable factor in causing a sizeable amount of the city’s population to defect from Byzantine stewardship to side with the Muslim invaders.

Byzantine counterattack

There were several Byzantine attempts to retake Alexandria. Though none of these were successful for a sustained period of time, Byzantine forces were able to briefly regain control of the city in 645. Arab chroniclers tell of a massive fleet and army sent by the Byzantines with the goal of retaking Alexandria. The imperial forces were led by a lower ranking imperial official named Manuel. After entering the city without facing much resistance, the Byzantines were able to regain control of both Alexandria and the surrounding Egyptian countryside. The Muslims retaliated by readying a large force of 15,000 who promptly set out to retake the city under command of the veteran Amr ibn Al-As. The Byzantines, following their standard tactical doctrine, advanced out of the city and sought an open battle away from the shelter of their fortifications. Accounts of the battle portray the Muslim forces as relying heavily on their archers before eventually assaulting the Byzantine positions, driving many back and routing the rest in the process. After this, the Byzantines were utterly defeated and withdrew from the region.

In 654, yet another attempt to bring Alexandria back into imperial hands failed when an invasion force sent by Constans II was repulsed. This generally marks the end of Byzantine attempts to retake the city.

Life under Rashidun rule 
There is much evidence to support that Alexandria continued to thrive under its new leaders. Muslim sources claim that, once subdued, the native population of Alexandria was remarkably receptive toward the rule of their Islamic governors, often favoring them to their previous Byzantine masters. In regards to the treatment of the native population, many sources point out the visible efforts made by the Muslims to respect the cultural identity and religious freedoms of the local population. In his analysis on the post-conquest status of regions affected by Islamic expansion, Dr. Gustav LeBon writes:

“However, the early Caliphs, who enjoyed a rare ingenuity which was unavailable to the propagandists of new faiths, realized that laws and religion cannot be imposed by force. Hence they were remarkably kind in the way they treated the peoples of Syria, Egypt, Spain and every other country they subdued, leaving them to practice their laws and regulations and beliefs and imposing only a small Jizya in return for their protection and keeping peace among them. In truth, nations have never known merciful and tolerant conquerors like the Arabs.”

In a later section LeBon further explains,

“The mercy and tolerance of the conquerors were among the reasons for the spread of their conquests and for the nations’ adoptions of their faith and regulations and language, which became deeply rooted, resisted all sorts of attack and remained even after the disappearance of the Arabs’ control on the world stage, though historians deny the fact. Egypt is the most evident proof of this. It adopted what the Arabs had brought over, and reserved it. Conquerors before the Arabs—the Persians, Greeks and Byzantines—could not overthrow the ancient Pharaoh civilization and impose what they had brought instead.”

Thus the majority of the population remained content and enjoyed a fair amount of local autonomy under Muslim leadership. The following is an account that reputedly took place shortly after the surrender of the city to Amr:

“And when [Amr] saw the patriarch, he received him with respect, and said to his companions and private friends: ‘Verily in all the lands of which we have taken possession hitherto I have never seen a man of God like this man. Then Amr turned to him, and said to him: ‘Resume the government of all your churches and of your people, and administer their affairs. And if you will pray for me, that I may go to the West and to Pentapolis, and take possession of them, as I have of Egypt, and return to you in safety and speedily, I will do for you all that you shall ask of me.” Then the holy patriarch Benjamin prayed for Amr, and pronounced an eloquent discourse, which made Amr and those present with him marvel, and which contained words of exhortation and much profit for those that heard him; and he revealed certain matters to Amr, and departed from his presence honored and revered.”

Other sources, however, point to the Pact of Umar as proof of Muslim oppression of Christians and Jews in the lands they conquered. Its points were as follows:
 Prohibition against building new churches, places of worship, monasteries, monks or a new cell. (Hence it was also forbidden to build new synagogues. It is known that new synagogues were only built after the occupation of Islam, for example in Jerusalem and Ramle. A similar law, prohibiting the build of new synagogues, existed in the Byzantines, and was therefore not new for all Jews. It was new for the Christians.)
 Prohibition against rebuilding destroyed churches, by day or night, in their own neighbourhoods or those situated in the quarters of the Muslims.
 The worship places of non-Muslims must be lower in elevation than the lowest mosque in town.
 The houses of non-Muslims must not be taller in elevation than the houses of Muslims.
 Prohibition against hanging a cross on the Churches.
 Muslims should be allowed to enter Churches (for shelter) in any time, both in day and night.
 Obliging the call of prayer by a bell or a kind of Gong (Nakos) to be low in volume.
 Prohibition of Christians and Jews against raising their voices at prayer times.
 Prohibition against teaching non-Muslim children the Qur'an.
 Christians were forbidden to show their religion in public, or to be seen with Christian books or symbols in public, on the roads or in the markets of the Muslims.
 Palm Sunday and Easter parades were banned.
 Funerals should be conducted quietly.
 Prohibition against burying non-Muslim dead near Muslims.
 Prohibition against raising a pig next to a Muslims neighbour.
 Christian were forbidden to sell Muslims alcoholic beverage.
 Christians were forbidden to provide cover or shelter for spies.
 Prohibition against telling a lie about Muslims.
 Obligation to show deference toward Muslims. If a Muslim wishes to sit, non-Muslim should be rise from his seats and let the Muslim sit.
 Prohibition against preaching to Muslims in an attempt to convert them from Islam. 
 Prohibition against preventing the conversion to Islam of some one who wants to convert.
 The appearance of the non-Muslims has to be different from those of the Muslims: Prohibition against wearing Qalansuwa (kind of dome that was used to wear by Bedouin), Bedouin turban (Amamh), Muslims shoes, and Sash to their waists. As to their heads, it was forbidden to comb the hair sidewise as the Muslim custom, and they were forced to cut the hair in the front of the head. Also non-Muslim shall not imitate the Arab-Muslim way of speech nor shall adopt the kunyas (Arabic byname, such as "abu Khattib").
 Obligation to identify non-Muslims as such by clipping the heads' forelocks and by always dressing in the same manner, wherever they go, with binding the zunnar (a kind of belt) around the waists. Christians to wear blue belts or turbans, Jews to wear yellow belts or turbans, Zoroastrians to wear black belts or turbans, and Samaritans to wear red belts or turbans.
 Prohibition against riding animals in the Muslim custom, and prohibition against riding with a saddle.
 Prohibition against adopting a Muslim title of honour.
 Prohibition against engraving Arabic inscriptions on signet seals.
 Prohibition against any possession of weapons.
 Non-Muslims must host a Muslim passerby for at least 3 days and feed him.
 Non-Muslims prohibited from buying a Muslim prisoner.
 Prohibition against taking slaves who have been allotted to Muslims.
 Prohibition against non-Muslims to lead, govern or employ Muslims.
 If a non-Muslim beats a Muslim, his Dhimmi protection is removed. 
 In return, the ruler would provide security for the Christian believers who follow the rules of the pact.

Islamic influence

Culturally, the city continued to function much the way it had under Byzantine rule. Greek, Coptic, and Arabic were all spoken fluently throughout the city and documents continued to be published in Greek and Coptic for some time following the takeover. Coptic was also continued in the fields of medicine, mathematics, and alchemy, whose practices thrived under the budding advances of Islamic intellectualism. However, after the 11th century, Arabic replaced Greek and Coptic as the principal language of the city.

In terms of religion, Alexandria was largely characterized by its heterogeneous makeup, both before and after the advent of Islam. Indeed, from the third century on, Alexandria served as a major base for both the practice of Monophysitism and Nestorianism, as well as a surprising number of other Christian sects that found refuge in Egypt.

From a cultural perspective, the practice of marriage between Muslim men and non-Muslim women was a fairly common one, and at least a sizeable portion of the Muslim invasion force that settled in and around the city of Alexandria took native Egyptian women as their brides. As this was typically discouraged by the umma and prohibited by the reigning caliph Umar, this gives credence to the Islamic state's desire to respect the lives of the local population rather than act as agents of disorder.

The fall of Alexandria and the acquisition of the Byzantine Empire's oriental provinces of Egypt and Syria are generally seen as a critical step towards the culmination of uniquely Islamic identity. The importance of Alexandria as the staging point for future conquests and economic purposes should not be dismissed. It is accurate then to say that the loss of these provinces paved the way for the future Muslim conquest of the Byzantine Exarchate of Africa, which included key cities such as Cyrenaica (642), Tripoli (643), and Kairouan (670). Thus the fall of Alexandria accentuated a clearly defined geopolitical shift in influence from the regions of interior Arabia to those of the Mediterranean and in the ensuing centuries, the significance of these conquests would allow Egypt to become the seat of dominant Muslim law.

References

Sources
 
 
 

Alexandria
641
Military history of Alexandria
Muslim conquest of Egypt
Alexandria
Alexandria
Alexandria
640s in the Byzantine Empire
Medieval Alexandria
640s in the Rashidun Caliphate
Religion in Alexandria